Madhyavyutpatti (Wylie: sGra sbyor bam po gñis pa) Two scrolls that were used as reference text for translating Sanskrit sutras into Tibetan language during Trisong Detsen's rule of Tibet during the early dissemination times. These two scrolls were used along with Mahavyutpatti, which standardized the translation rules along with its pronunciation from various Sanskrit scrolls or exposition of sutra, vinaya, abhidharma, and even mantras and dharanis.

External links

Mahāvyutpatti with sGra sbyor bam po gñis pa, in the Bibliotheca Polyglotta

9th century in Tibet